Officially known as le Club de hockey Canadien, the Montreal Canadiens are a Canadian professional ice hockey team based in Montreal, Quebec. They play in the Atlantic Division of the Eastern Conference in the National Hockey League (NHL). In 1909, the Canadiens were founded as a charter member of the National Hockey Association (NHA). In 1917, the franchise joined the NHL, and is one of the Original Six teams. In their 100-year history, the Canadiens have won 24 Stanley Cup championships, and are the last Canadian team to have won the Stanley Cup, having done so in 1993. Having played in the Jubilee Arena (1909–1910,1918–1919), the Montreal Arena (1911–1918), the Mount Royal Arena (1919–1926), and the Montreal Forum (1926–1996), the Canadiens have played their home games at the Bell Centre, formerly known as the Molson Centre, since 1996. The Canadiens are owned by the Molson Family. The general manager position is filled by Kent Hughes while their coaches consist of Martin St. Louis as their head coach, Alexandre Burrows, Trevor Letowski, and Stephane Robidas as assistant coaches, and Eric Raymond as the goaltender coach. The current captain of the Canadiens is Nick Suzuki.

There have been 28 head coaches for the Canadiens franchise in the NHL. The team's first head coach in the NHL was Newsy Lalonde, who coached the Canadiens for eight NHL seasons in two stints. Although Dick Irvin coached the team for 15 seasons, Toe Blake, who coached two fewer seasons, is the franchise's all-time leader for the most regular-season games coached (914), the most regular-season games won (500), the most regular-season points (1159), the most playoff games coached (119), and the most playoff games won (82). Blake has also won the most Stanley Cup championships with eight; Scotty Bowman has won five, Irvin has won three, Cecil Hart has won two, and Leo Dandurand, Claude Ruel, Al MacNeil, Jean Perron, and Jacques Demers have won one each. Lalonde won a Stanley Cup championship in 1915–16 while in the NHA. Bowman and Pat Burns have each been awarded the Jack Adams Award, in 1976–77 and 1988–89 respectively. Nine head coaches have spent their entire NHL head coaching careers with the Canadiens. Bowman and Dandurand have been elected to the Hockey Hall of Fame as builders. Dandurand is the only coach to have spent his entire NHL head coaching career with the Canadiens and to have been elected to the Hockey Hall of Fame as a builder.

Key

Coaches

Note: Statistics are correct through the end of the 2021–22 season. This list only includes NHL coaches, and not NHA seasons.

Notes
  A running total of the number of coaches of the Canadiens. Thus, any coach who has two or more separate terms as head coach is only counted once.
  Before the 2005–06 season, the NHL instituted a penalty shootout for regular season games that remained tied after a five-minute overtime period, which prevented ties.
  In ice hockey, the winning percentage is calculated by dividing points by maximum possible points.
  Each year is linked to an article about that particular NHL season.
  Newsy Lalonde, Babe Siebert, Sylvio Mantha, Dick Irvin, Toe Blake, Bernie Geoffrion, Jacques Lemaire, Jacques Laperriere, Bob Gainey, and Martin St. Louis have been inducted into the Hockey Hall of Fame as players.
  Babe Siebert was named the head coach for the 1939–40 season, but died from drowning during the off-season.

References
General
 
Specific

 
Montreal Canadiens head coaches
head coaches